Dragarino is a village in the Bitola Municipality of North Macedonia. It used to be part of the former municipality of Kukurečani.

As of the 2021 census, Dragarino had 84 residents with the following ethnic composition:
Macedonians 77
Persons for whom data are taken from administrative sources 7

According to the 2002 census, it has a population of 86. The entirety of the village are ethnic Macedonians.

Dragarino is made up mainly of houses and farms, although it is also home to a small yet impressive Macedonian Orthodox church, which is adjacent to a cemetery. The children in the village attend school in Kukurečani, which is named after Aleksandar Turundzhev. 

Although Dragarino is a very small village, a multitude of Macedonian Australians in Perth and Melbourne can trace their origins back to Dragarino after some of it's residents emigrated to Australia in the 1970's.

References

Villages in Bitola Municipality